Ralph S. Mouse is the third in a children's novel trilogy that was written by Beverly Cleary. It features Ralph, a mouse with the ability to speak, but only with certain people who tend to be loners. It was first published in 1982, illustrated by Paul O. Zelinsky.

A film adaptation was broadcast in the ABC Weekend Special series in 1991.

Plot summary 
Ralph has befriended a young boy named Ryan, the son of the inn's new housekeeper. Ryan has given Ralph the full name of "Ralph S. Mouse", the middle initial standing for "Smart". Meanwhile, Ralph becomes agitated at his family, because he doesn't want them riding his motorcycle. Worried that their droppings on the floor will result in anti-mouse retaliation by the hotel staff, he asks Ryan to take him to school, where he plans to hide and live out the rest of his life. 

Ralph is discovered by Ryan's classmates, who adopt him as a class pet and decide to see how smart he is by building a maze for him to run through. All this time, Ryan is having difficulty with an aggressive boy named Brad from his class who accidentally breaks Ralph's motorcycle, and Ralph blames Ryan and runs away to hide in the school. However, Ralph also confronts Brad for breaking his motorcycle, and Brad, realizing that Ralph can talk, offers to set things right for both him and Ryan. Ryan and Brad discover that they have much in common, and become friends. 

Ryan reclaims Ralph and brings him home on the school bus on the day that his new friend comes with him to visit at the inn. Brad also atones for his destruction of Ralph's treasured motorcycle by giving him a model "Laser XL7" sports car. Ralph discovers that he can't move the car by making the same noise as his motorcycle; he has to go "vroom-vroom" instead. Ralph further discovers that he can safely give his younger relatives rides in the car without worrying that they will be irresponsible with it (but only Ralph can drive the car). Brad's father meets Ryan's mother and they get married six months later; thus, Ryan and Brad are now stepbrothers.

Series 
 The Mouse and the Motorcycle (1965)
 Runaway Ralph (1970)
 Ralph S. Mouse (1982)

Film adaptation
Churchill Films produced an adaptation of Ralph S. Mouse in 1990, directed by Thomas G. Smith, and animation directed by John Clark Matthews, starring Robert Oliveri as Ryan. It aired as part of the ABC Weekend Special in 1991.

References

1982 American novels
1982 children's books
ABC Weekend Special
Golden Kite Award-winning works
American novels adapted into films
Children's books adapted into films
English-language novels
Books about mice and rats
Novels by Beverly Cleary
Books illustrated by Paul O. Zelinsky
William Morrow and Company books